Nyan Win (born 22 January 1953) is the Chief Minister of Bago Region from 2011 to 2016. He won a Regional Hluttaw seat in an uncontested election in 2010, representing Zigon Township, and was appointed Chief Minister of the region on 30 March 2011. Prior to his election, he was the Minister of Foreign Affairs of Myanmar, having been appointed on 18 September 2004. He was a Major General in the Burmese Army. He was Deputy Chief of Military Training for the Myanmar Armed Forces before he became a member of the SPDC. He also served as Commandant of CGSC (Command and General Staff College). He graduated from the 18th intake of Defence Services Academy (DSA). He is married to Myint Myint Soe.

References

External links
Myanmar apologizes, Japan seeks explanations
Myanmar violence blamed on 'opportunists' backed by 'powerful countries'
Foreign Minister Nyan Win addresses the United Nations General Assembly, September 28, 2010

Living people
Foreign ministers of Myanmar
Government ministers of Myanmar
Defence Services Academy alumni
1953 births
People from Bago Region
Burmese generals